Judaea was a Roman province which incorporated the regions of Judea, Samaria, and Idumea from 6 CE, extending over parts of the former regions of the Hasmonean and Herodian kingdoms of Judea. The name Judaea, like the similar Judea, was derived from the Iron Age Kingdom of Judah, but the Roman province encompassed a much larger territory.

With the transition to full Roman province, Judaea became subject to direct Roman rule, replacing a system of semi-autonomous vassalage that had existed since the Roman Republic conquest of the region in 63 BCE. The change was enacted by the Roman emperor Augustus after an appeal by the populace against the ill rule of Herod Archelaus. With the onset of direct rule, the official census instituted by Publius Sulpicius Quirinius, the governor of Roman Syria, nevertheless caused tensions and led to an uprising by Judas of Galilee. In other notable events in the period, the crucifixion of Jesus in 30–33 CE led to the emergence of the Jewish Christian groups that later developed into Christianity, while in 37 CE, Emperor Caligula ordered the erection of a statue of himself in the Jewish temple, an episode known as the Caligula Crisis.

Growing discontent at Roman rule led to the First Jewish–Roman War in 66-73 CE and ultimately the Siege of Jerusalem and destruction of the temple in 70 CE, bringing an end to the Second Temple period. Following the war, the Fiscus Judaicus was instituted. In 132 AD, the province of Judaea was merged with Galilee into an enlarged province named Syria Palaestina.

Background

The first intervention of Rome in the region dates from 63 BCE, following the end of the Third Mithridatic War, when Rome established the province of Syria. After the defeat of Mithridates VI of Pontus, Pompey sacked Jerusalem and installed the Hasmonean prince Hyrcanus II as Ethnarch and High Priest, but not as king. Some years later Julius Caesar appointed Antipater the Idumaean, also known as Antipas, as the first Roman Procurator. Antipater's son Herod was designated "King of the Jews" by the Roman Senate in 40 BCE but he did not gain military control until 37 BCE. During his reign the last representatives of the Hasmoneans were eliminated, and the huge port of Caesarea Maritima was built.

Herod died in 4 BCE, and his kingdom was divided among three of his sons, two of whom (Philip and Herod Antipas) became tetrarchs ('rulers of a quarter part'). The third son, Archelaus, became an ethnarch and ruled over half of his father's kingdom. One of these principalities was Judea, corresponding to the territory of the historic Judea, plus Samaria and Idumea.

Archelaus ruled Judea so badly that he was dismissed in 6 CE by the Roman emperor Augustus, after an appeal from his own population. Herod Antipas, ruler of Galilee and Perea from 4 BCE, was dismissed by Emperor Caligula in 39 CE. Herod's son Philip ruled the northeastern part of his father's kingdom.

Judea as Roman province(s)

Revolt and removal of Herod Archelaus 
Following the death of Herod the Great, the Herodian Kingdom of Judea was divided into the Herodian Tetrarchy, jointly ruled by Herod's sons and sister: Herod Archelaus (who ruled Judea, Samaria and Idumea), Herod Philip (who ruled Batanea, Trachonitis as well as Auranitis), Herod Antipas (who ruled Galilee and Perea) and Salome I (who briefly ruled Jamnia).

A messianic revolt erupted in Judea in 4 BCE because of Archelaus's incompetence; the revolt was brutally crushed by the Legate of Syria, Publius Quinctilius Varus, who occupied Jerusalem and crucified 2000 Jewish rebels.

Because of his failure to properly rule Judea, Archelaus was removed from his post by Emperor Augustus in 6 CE, while Judea, Samaria and Idumea came under direct Roman administration.

Under a prefect (6-41) 
The Judean province did not initially include Galilee, Gaulanitis (today's Golan), nor Peraea or the Decapolis. Its revenue was of little importance to the Roman treasury, but it controlled the land and coastal sea routes to the "bread basket" of Egypt and was a buffer against the Parthian Empire. The capital was moved from Jerusalem to Caesarea Maritima. 

Augustus appointed Publius Sulpicius Quirinius to the post of Legate of Syria and he conducted the first Roman tax census of Syria and Judea in 6 CE, which triggered the revolt of Judas of Galilee; the revolt was quickly crushed by Quirinius. 

Judea was not a senatorial province, nor an imperial province, but instead was a "satellite of Syria" governed by a prefect who was a knight of the Equestrian Order (as was that of Roman Egypt), not a former consul or praetor of senatorial rank. Quirinius appointed Coponius as first prefect of Judea.

Still, Jews living in the province maintained some form of independence and could judge offenders by their own laws, including capital offenses, until c. 28 CE. Judea in the early Roman period was divided into five administrative districts with centers in Jerusalem, Gadara, Amathus, Jericho, and Sepphoris.

In 30-33 CE, Roman prefect Pontius Pilate, at the request of the Jewish authorities, had Jesus of Nazareth crucified on the charge of sedition, an act that led to the birth of Christianity. In 36 CE another messianic revolt erupted near Mount Gerizim, under the lead of a Samaritan, and was quickly crushed by Pilate; the Samaritans complained against Pilate's brutality to the Legate of Syria Lucius Vitellius the Elder, who removed Pilate from his post and sent him to Rome to account, replacing him with an acting prefect called Marcellus.

In 37 CE, Emperor Caligula ordered the erection of a statue of himself in the Jewish Temple of Jerusalem, a demand in conflict with Jewish monotheism. The Legate of Syria, Publius Petronius, fearing civil war if the order was carried out, delayed implementing it for nearly a year. King Herod Agrippa I finally convinced Caligula to reverse the order. Caligula later issued a second order to have his statue erected in the Temple of Jerusalem, but he was murdered before the statue reached Jerusalem and his successor Claudius rescinded the order. The "Crisis under Caligula" has been proposed as the first open break between Rome and the Jews.

Autonomy under Herod Agrippa (41–44)
Between 41 and 44 CE, Judea regained its nominal autonomy, when Herod Agrippa was made King of the Jews by the emperor Claudius, thus in a sense restoring the Herodian dynasty, although there is no indication that Judea ceased to be a Roman province simply because it no longer had a prefect. Claudius had decided to allow, across the empire, procurators, who had been personal agents to the Emperor often serving as provincial tax and finance ministers, to be elevated to governing magistrates with full state authority to keep the peace. He may have elevated Judea's procurator to imperial governing status because the imperial legate of Syria was not sympathetic to the Judeans.

Under a procurator (44–66)
Following Agrippa's death in 44, the province returned to direct Roman control, incorporating Agrippa's personal territories of Galilee and Peraea, under a row of procurators. Nevertheless, Agrippa's son, Agrippa II was designated King of the Jews in 48. He was the seventh and last of the Herodians.

A famine took place in Jerusalem, likely between 44 and 48, which Josephus describes as follows:

Between the years 66-70 follows the Great Revolt.

Under a legate (70–132)
From 70 until 135 Judea's rebelliousness required a governing Roman legate capable of commanding legions. Because Agrippa II maintained loyalty to the Empire, the Kingdom was retained until he died, either in 93/94 or 100, when the area returned to complete, undivided Roman control.

Judaea was the stage of two, possibly three, major Jewish–Roman wars:
66–70 CE– First Jewish–Roman War, resulting in the siege of Jerusalem, the destruction of Herod's Temple and ending with the siege of Masada in 73–74 (see Josephus). Before the war Judaea was a Roman province of the third category, that is, under the administration of a procurator of equestrian rank and under the overall control of the governor of Syria. After the war it became an independent Roman province with the official name of Judaea and under the administration of a governor of praetorian rank, and was therefore moved up into the second category (it was only later, in about 120, that Judaea became a consular province, that is, with a governor of consular rank).
115–117 – the Kitos War (Second Jewish-Roman War); Judea's role in it is disputed though, as it played itself out mainly in the Jewish diaspora and there are no fully trustworthy sources on Judea's participation in the rebellion, nor is there any archaeological way of distinguishing destruction levels of 117 CE from those of the major Bar Kokhba's revolt (Third Jewish-Roman War) revolt of just a decade and a half later.
132 – The province of Judaea was merged with Galilee into an enlarged province named Syria Palaestina. As a result of the Jews' defeat in the Third Jewish-Roman War, Jerusalem was destroyed. A few years later, a new colony was founded in its place, named Aelia Capitolina. One scholarly view the aim of renaming Judea was to disassociate the Jewish people from the land, though other explanations have also been proposed, and an alternative theory is that the renaming efforts preceded and helped precipitate the rebellion. The renaming did not prevent the Jewish people from referring to the country in their writings as either "Yehudah" or "The Land of Israel".

Division into three provinces (135)

Under Diocletian (284–305) the region was divided into three provinces:
 Palaestina Prima (Judea, Samaria, Idumea, Peraea and the coastal plain, with Caesarea Maritima as capital)
 Palaestina Secunda (Galilee, Decapolis and Golan, with Beth-Shean as capital)
 Palaestina Tertia (the Negev desert, with Petra as capital).

List of governors (6–135 CE)

References

Works cited

External links

 Jewish Encyclopedia: Procurators of Iudaea
 Procurators, Jewish Encyclopedia, 1906
 The name Rome gave to the land of Israel

 
0s establishments in the Roman Empire
6 establishments
130s disestablishments in the Roman Empire
Classical Palestine
Classical Syria
Ancient history of Jordan
Israel in the Roman era
Political entities in the Land of Israel
Samaria
1st-century Judaism
2nd-century Judaism
States and territories disestablished in the 2nd century
States and territories established in the 0s